Valerie Sybil Wilmer (born 7 December 1941) is a British photographer and writer specialising in jazz, gospel, blues, and British African-Caribbean music and culture. Her notable books include Jazz People (1970) and As Serious As Your Life (1977), both first published by Allison and Busby.

Early life
Val Wilmer was born in Harrogate, Yorkshire, England, on 7 December 1941. She is the sister of the poet and writer Clive Wilmer. As soon as World War II was over, her family returned to living in London. 

She began her life in the jazz world by listening to pre-war recordings of jazz classics, being led to many important recordings through Rudi Blesh's Shining Trumpets, a history of jazz, and Jazz by Rex Harris. Wilmer became entranced by recordings by Bessie Smith ("Empty Bed Blues") and the singing of Fats Waller – going to the Swing Shop in Streatham, south London, at the age of 12, combing through the jazz records until she found something she wanted to hear.

Three years after these explorations in sound, Wilmer began writing about Black music, encouraged and inspired by Max Jones, Paul Oliver and others. She attended concerts accompanied by her mother, who believed her too young to go on her own. Wilmer states that it was a “tribute to [her] mother's tolerance" being allowed to explore her interests so freely, especially during a time when little girls were often informed of the limitations of their own future options: "Little girls, we are often told, want to grow up to be ballet dancers ... I don’t think it ever crossed my mind to consider the usual female options, resolutely opposed as I was to anything that smacked of feminine pursuits and did not involve going places, being and doing."

Writing career
Aware of the earliest records of jazz and blues, Wilmer began to write about jazz and other African-American music, focusing on the political and social messages of the music. Her first article (a biography of Jesse Fuller) appeared in Jazz Journal in May 1959 when she was still only 17. Reflecting on how this piece originated, Wilmer states: "I was an inveterate letter writer, that's how the break with Jesse Fuller came about, me writing to him out of the blue. Woe betide any American musician who was foolish enough to have a contact address published somewhere — I'd find it and fire off a letter. The amazing thing was really, I mean really, that so many would reply! These great musicians and characters from a black culture on the other side of the world writing back to this young suburban white girl in England."

Fundamental to Wilmer's work is her keen understanding and insightful expression of the disparity between male and female music writers. Entering this world in 1959, she understood that writing about music was “something that men did. There was a penalty to pay for being a woman in a man’s world…[and] for a white woman to be concerned with something that Black people did meant to experience additional pressure." Through African-American music Wilmer was able to immerse herself in realities that would have stayed undiscovered had she remained within the margins of her comfort-zone. For her, these experiences were fundamental and life-changing. Her perseverance in this difficult sphere and her devotion to the music led her to a path of self-discovery and personal growth, and the understanding of "the potential for personal change that exists in us all." Through her writing about music, Wilmer was able to provide a voice to a transatlantic, multicultural, and multiracial dialogue, delving into a "part of history, or [what] might very soon be."

Since 1959, she has interviewed hundreds of musicians, written previews and criticism. Her work has been cited and used in research for many books, articles and films, including several biographies of major musicians. Her early interviews with Earle Warren, Lee Young, and Paul "Polo" Barnes are cited in Douglas Henry Daniels's biography of Lester Young. Interviews with Thelonious Monk, Nellie Monk and Billy Higgins are cited in Robin D. G. Kelley's biography of Thelonious Monk. Other examples of the use of Wilmer's early interviews include "Texas Trombone: Henry Coker" in Dave Oliphant's books Texan Jazz and Jazz Mavericks of the Lone Star State.

She was later to gain recognition for her interviews of saxophonists Joe Harriott and Ornette Coleman, and become a writer, music critic and photographer. Writing in 1965 of the changes in Monk's style, she says: "For the last 10 years of so, Monk's music has become easier to listen to, though it is not necessarily any simpler. What he is doing is as engaging and profound as ever, though seeming to be less provocative than when he was upsetting rules."

Her essays and obituaries are notable for their ability to subtly reveal the underlying inequities that Black artists and women faced in the music industry, often using their own words. In a 15 July 1960 obituary in Jazz News, Wilmer quotes Memphis Slim: "I also wanted to get my own publishing company, but the record men don't want to hire a guy who's got his own publishing company," revealing the difficulty he faced as a black artist. Speaking of her friendship with the influential lyricist, music critic, interviewer and singer Kitty Grime, Wilmer demonstrates her love, respect and admiration, while also revealing the masculine bias in the world of music: "It was during this heady period that we met, at a time when the jazz scene was virtually an all-male preserve...her awareness and knowledgeability were something that most younger commentators would be hard put to emulate".

In her writing, she continuously keeps jazz history at the forefront, and presents herself as a devout listener, admirer and lover of music. Nevertheless, she admits to having interviewed the brothers Albert Ayler and Donald Ayler as a journalistic exercise and not a fan, yet eventually she "would come to admire Albert Ayler as the last major jazz visionary".

Although Wilmer's forte is jazz and blues, she is versed in the larger movements in music history and reveals her versatility across genres when, for instance, she writes about how Jimi Hendrix's visit to England in 1966 gave "the floundering local scene a much-needed injection".

Wilmer has contributed to a vast array of publications, including Melody Maker, Down Beat (she was its UK correspondent, 1966–1970), Jazz Journal, Musics, Double Bassist, Mojo, The Wire, and regularly contributes obituaries of musicians to The Guardian.

Jazz People (1970)

Wilmer's first book, Jazz People, was published by Allison & Busby in 1970 (subsequently issued in the US by Da Capo Press) and is now often referred to as one of the "three or four finest books ever written on jazz".<ref>[https://books.google.com/books?id=YN-StAEACAAJ People] at Google Books.</ref> It features interviews with American musicians who include Eddie "Lockjaw" Davis, Art Farmer, Babs Gonzales, Jimmy Heath, Billy Higgins, Thelonious Monk, Archie Shepp, Cecil Taylor, Clark Terry, Big Joe Turner and Randy Weston, and as Kirkus Reviews noted: "The emphasis is on the people in these fourteen interviews, the personalities behind the jazz, their moods, ambitions, influences....The author observes well and the profiles are short and sharp with high notes for the buff."

The Face of Black Music (1976)

Rated "as important a photographer as she is a writer", Wilmer is the author of the photograph-led The Face of Black Music (Da Capo Press, 1976), which like Jazz People is considered a canonical and influential text in music criticism.

As Serious As Your Life (1977)

Wilmer's book As Serious as Your Life, first published in 1977 by Allison and Busby, is now a classic of jazz writing, referencing in its title something said to her by McCoy Tyner: "Music's not a plaything; it's as serious as your life." The first account of the revolutionary "free jazz" and its practitioners, it also documents women's experiences in relation to the "new jazz" in African-American communities, and deviates from the "masculinist rule of exclusion". Presenting sexual politics in the world of jazz, Wilmer unearthed sexual politics in music criticism itself. In her work, she presents a "superb descriptive journey that moves the reader through a number of seemingly incommensurable communities simultaneously.... This is the vision and possibility of community when the struggle toward freedom recognizes the intersections of sexual difference, gender, and sexuality in addition to race and class, as the basis for improvisational practices". As Serious As Your Life was reprinted by Serpent's Tail in March 2018, when Michael J. Agovino wrote in The Village Voice: "During the 1960s and '70s 'counterculture', much of which became a massive cash register, Val Wilmer fixed her strobe lights onto a musical and political landscape that really did in fact run counter to the culture. A shame so few — blacks and whites — were paying attention at the time. But her book, and the work it documented, remains as serious, and necessary, as ever."

Mama Said There'd Be Days Like This (1989)
Wilmer's autobiography, Mama Said There'd Be Days Like This: My Life in the Jazz World (Women's Press, 1989), details her development as an artist/journalist, and includes her coming out as a lesbian in a largely heterosexist musical milieu.

Other documentation and archival projects
In addition, Wilmer has consistently over the years written biographical articles on Black British musicians from the 1940s and 1950s and about photography. She was a member of the advisory board for The New Grove Dictionary of Jazz (2nd edition), edited by Barry Kernfeld, and the author of 63 entries. Wilmer provided the foreword to John Gray's Fire Music: A Bibliography of the New Jazz, 1959-1990. She has written more than 35 articles for the Oxford Dictionary of National Biography. The British Library Sound Archive contains 35 of Wilmer's interviews with black British musicians and women musicians in its Oral History of Jazz in Britain.

Wilmer has amassed a collection of historic photos of black people in Britain, some of which have been on public display (including in Autograph ABP's 2014 exhibition Black Chronicles II at Rivington Place), and she is working on a project to research the lives of black British musicians, which she has been documenting for many years.

Photography
Wilmer is as important a photographer as she is a writer, having worked with hundreds of singers, jazz musicians and writers, and she has taken noted photographs of artists such as Langston Hughes, Louis Armstrong, John Coltrane, and Duke Ellington. Her photographs were exhibited at the Victoria and Albert Museum (V&A) in the 1973 exhibition Jazz Seen: The Face of Black Music, and form part of the V&A's photographic collection. Her photographs are also held in the National Portrait Gallery collection.

She has written about photography and interviewed practitioners including Eve Arnold, Anthony Barboza, Roy DeCarava, Terry Cryer, Milt Hinton, John Hopkins, Danny Lyon, Raissa Page (of Greenham Common fame), Coreen Simpson, Beuford Smith and James Van Der Zee. In the 1980s, Wilmer compiled and edited the "Evidence" issue of Ten.8 magazine devoted to the work of African-American photographers. Wilmer's work has often been used in conjunction with music albums, as in the digipak booklet for Honest Jon's London is the Place for Me no. 4 CD, which includes photographs by her that "are full of warmth and immediacy".

With Maggie Murray, Wilmer founded Format, the first all-women photographers' agency in Britain, in 1983.Hopkinson, Amanda, "Raissa Page obituary", The Guardian, 21 September 2011.

In September 2013, while Ronnie Scott's Jazz Club in Frith Street, Soho, was undergoing redecoration, a 12-metre-square hoarding was erected on the façade with a tribute to its eponymous founder in the form of a massive photograph by Wilmer of him smoking a cigarette outside the club, and one of his legendary one-liners: "I love this place, it's just like home, filthy and full of strangers."Newey, Jon, "Jazz breaking news: Ronnie Scott’s Covers Up", Jazzwise, 27 August 2013.

Wilmer's work was featured in the Esquire Cover Club, the London Jazz Festival's digital exhibition for 2020.

Collections
Photographic works by Wilmer are held by the Arts Council of Great Britain Collection; the National Portrait Gallery; Victoria and Albert Museum; Musée d'Art Moderne, Paris; Fotografiska Museet, Stockholm; Smithsonian Institution, Washington DC; and the Schomburg Center for Research in Black Culture (New York Public Library).

BibliographyJazz People. London: Allison & Busby, 1970; Indianapolis: Bobbs-Merrill Company, 1970; reprinted Quartet books, 1977. New edition Da Capo Press, 1991.The Face of Black Music: Photographs by Valerie Wilmer. New York: Da Capo Press, 1976.As Serious as Your Life: The Story of the New Jazz. London: Allison & Busby, 1977. New edition with introduction by Richard Williams from Serpent's Tail, March 2018, .Mama Said There'd Be Days Like This: My Life in the Jazz World. London: Women's Press, 1989, .

Awards and recognition
In 2009 Val Wilmer was honoured with a Parliamentary Jazz Award for Services to Jazz.

In July 2017, she featured in "The Wire Salon: An Audience with Val Wilmer" at Cafe Oto.

She is the subject of BBC Radio 3's Sunday Feature: A Portrait of Val Wilmer, produced by Steve Urquhart (featuring contributions from Margaret Busby, Paul Gilroy, Richard Williams, Andrew Cyrille, and Clive Wilmer), which was first broadcast on 4 March 2018."7 Candid Photos of Jazz Legends", Sunday Feature: A Portrait of Val Wilmer (4 March 2018), BBC Radio 3. The following week, she was also featured by Robert Elms as a "Listed Londoner" on his BBC Radio London programme.

In 2019, Wilmer received the Lona Foote/Bob Parent Award for Career Excellence in Photography at the 24th annual Jazz Journalists Association Jazz Awards.

In 2020, Wilmer became a Patron of the National Jazz Archive.

References

Sources and further readingContemporary Authors: A Bio-Bibliographical Guide to Current Writers in Fiction, General Nonfiction, Poetry, Journalism, Drama, Motion Pictures, Television, and Other Field: 85-88 (Detroit: Cengage Gale, 1980).
Davies, Sue. Contemporary Photographers, Martin Marix Evans, ed. (New York: St. James Press, 1995).
Fischlin, David, and Ajay Heble. The Other Side of Nowhere: Jazz, Improvisation, and Communities in Dialogue, 1st edition, Middletown: Wesleyan University Press, 2004.
Ford, Robert. A Blues Bibliography (Bromley: Paul Pelletier Publishing, 1999; 2nd edition, New York: Routledge, 2007).
Gannon, Robert. "Wilmer, Valerie",The New Grove Dictionary of Jazz, Barry Dean Kernfeld, ed. (London: MacMillan Press, 1988), p. 1299; entry revised by B. Kernfeld (2nd edition, 2002).
Gray, John. Fire Music: A Bibliography of the New Jazz, 1959–1990 (Westport: Greenwood, 1991).
Gray, Michael. The Bob Dylan Encyclopedia (London: Continuum International Publishing Group, 2006).
McKay, George. Circular Breathing: The Cultural Politics of Jazz in Britain (Durham: Duke University Press, 2005).
Mathieson, Kenny. Encyclopaedia of Blues. Komara, Edward, ed. (New York: Routledge, 2006).
Oliphant, Dave. Jazz Mavericks of the Lone Star State (Austin: University of Texas Press, 2007).
Trynka, Paul; photographs by Val Wilmer. Portrait of the Blues (New York: Da Capo Press, 1997).
Wilmer, Valerie. "Monk on Monk", Down Beat, 3 June 1965: pp. 20–22.
---. "New York is Alive! Report and Photography by Valerie Wilmer". Jazz Forum, 1973: pp. 47–49.
---. "Rock and Roll Genius" [interview with Otis Blackwell]. Melody Maker, 5 February 1977, Vol. 52: pp. 8, 44.
---. "The first preference is pride" [interview with Jayaben Desai], Time Out, 15–21 September 1978, pp. 14–15
---. "Gilmore and 'Trane: The Sun Ra Link". Melody Maker, 27 December 1980. Vol. 55: pp. 16–17.
---. "'I'm Happy as All Hell that the Man Took My Songs'" [interview with Otis Blackwell]. Time Out. 6–12 March 1981, pp. 12–13
---. "Rudolph Dunbar". City Limits, March 1986: pp. 84–86.
---. "Mama Said There'd Be Days Like This: Valerie Wilmer Responds to Max Harrison's Review of her Book". Jazz Forum, 4 March 1990: pp. 4–5.
---. "How We Met: Lauderic Caton and Louis Stephenson". The Independent on Sunday Review, 7 February 1993: p. 61.
---. "Jimi Hendrix: An Experience". Down Beat, February 1994: pp. 38–40.
---. "The First Time I Met the Blues". Mojo, September 1995. 22: pp. 84–85.
---. "Spirits Rejoice: Albert and Don Ayler". Coda: The Journal of Jazz and Improvised Music, March–April 1997: pp. 4–7.
---. "Coleridge Goode: Improving with Age". Double Bassist, 2003: pp. 12–15.
---. "Roswell Rudd and the Chartreuse Phantasm". The Wire, Issue 249, November 2004: pp. 28–31.
---. "A Blue Mariner's Legacy". Double Bassist, 2005: pp. 24–26.
---. "Kitty Grime". Jazz Journal International, 2007: pp. 18–19.

External links

Bayley, Bruno. "England is the Place for Me: Val Wilmer's Hidden Photographs Uncovered. A Forgotten History of Black London", Vice, Vol. 15, no. 5.
Carney, John."They Made Magic. Part 2: Val Wilmer", Tangents: The Home of Unpopular Culture (2006).
Rasheed, Kameelah. "'Space is the Place': Val Wilmer Photographs Sun Ra", The Liberator Magazine.
Valerie Wilmer's contributions to Obituaries pages, The Guardian.
Wilmer, Val. "Jazz and Blues and Blues and Jazz", Vice, Vol. 16, no. 7.
 "Val Wilmer – Journalist, historian and photographer", Women's Liberation Music Archive, Feminist Music-Making in the UK and Ireland, 1970–1990.
 "Blues Britannia – Val Wilmer's photo memories" (a selection of photographs from BBC Four's Blues Britannia, taken by Val Wilmer), BBC.
 Jazz Diary / Jane Richards on Val Wilmer, The Independent, 7 September 1992.
 "Val Wilmer", photograph by Lucinda Douglas-Menzies at National Portrait Gallery, London, 2013.
 "Masters of Jazz Photography — Val Wilmer", Jerry Jazz Musician, 17 April 2015.
 Lee, Karen (Weekend Family Music Hour), "Val Wilmer Is Seriously As Serious As Her Life", Freeform Portland'', 15 February 2018.
 "Val Wilmer interviewed by John Fordham Oct 2020". SeriousLive (audio). 

1941 births
Living people
20th-century British photographers
20th-century English women artists
20th-century English women writers
20th-century women photographers
21st-century British photographers
21st-century English women artists
21st-century English women writers
21st-century women photographers
English music journalists
English women journalists
English women photographers
Jazz photographers
Jazz writers
English LGBT writers
Music historians
Photographers from London
Women writers about music